Súbete a Mi Moto is a biographical streaming television series about the Latin boy band Menudo. The series narrates the history of the band from its creation to its evolution and international success. Menudo was the band that launched music stars such as Ricky Martin and others. Consisting of 15 episodes of 60 minutes each, the series premiered on Amazon Prime Video on October 9, 2020, in Mexico, Latin America, and Spain. In the United States, the series premiered on Estrella TV on February 14, 2021.

Cast 
 Felipe Albors and Ethan Schwartz as Ricky Martin
 Marcelo Otaño and Eugenio Rivera as Ricky Meléndez
 Samu Jove as Xavier Serbia
 Gustavo Rosa as Sergio Blass
 Alejandro Bermúdez as Rene Farrait
 Lionel Otero as Johnny Lozada
 Mauro Hernández as Miguel Cancel
 Yamil Ureña and Braulio Castillo, Jr. as Edgardo Díaz, founder and manager of Menudo
 Sian Chiong as Joselo Vega
 Marisol Calero as Doña Panchi
 Josette Vidal as Julieta Torres
 Rocío Verdejo as Renata Torres
 Adrián Isaac Rivera as Rubén Gomez
 Diego Rodulfo Martínez as Charlie Masso 
 Pedro Emiliano Vazquez as Robby Rosa
 Sergio Mancilla López as Ashley Ruiz
 Amanda Rivera Torres as Millie Aviles

Episodes

Production 
In July 2019, SOMOS Productions, Endemol Shine Boomdog, and Piñolywood Studios announced the production of Súbete a Mi Moto. The series was filmed in Mexico and Puerto Rico.

Reception 
On the review aggregation website Tomatazos, the first season has a positive score of 75%. The website's critical consensus summary states, "A good trip to the past that recalls a band that defined the youth of a certain public, but that doesn't ignore the darkest moments in the lives of its members."

References

External links 
 

Amazon Prime Video original programming
Television series based on singers and musicians
2020 Mexican television series debuts
Spanish-language television shows
2020s drama television series